Before Dawn is a 1933 American pre-Code drama film directed by Irving Pichel and written by Garrett Fort. The film stars Stuart Erwin, Dorothy Wilson, Warner Oland,  Dudley Digges and Gertrude Hoffman. It is one of the few Oland films from this period in which he does not play an Asian character. The film was released on August 4, 1933 by RKO Pictures.

Plot
Dying gangster Joe Valerie reveals the hiding place of a million dollars in loot to his physician Dr. Cornelius. The sinister Austrian doctor has designs on the money, but must first outwit detective Dwight Wilson and clairvoyant Patricia Merrick. The setting is an eerie, possibly haunted house in small-town America where the stash is hidden and the bodies begin to accumulate.

Cast 
 Stuart Erwin as Dwight Wilson
 Dorothy Wilson as Patricia
 Warner Oland as Dr. Paul Cornelius
 Dudley Digges as Horace Merrick
 Gertrude Hoffman as Mattie
 Oscar Apfel as O'Hara
 Frank Reicher as Joe Valerie
 Jane Darwell as Mrs. Marble

Reception
In a contemporary review for The New York Times, critic Mordaunt Hall wrote: "[T]his particular ruddy specimen is blessed with vigor and imagination. ... There are enough killings and accidental deaths to satisfy the most ardent enthusiasts of such thrillers. And added to this phase of the narrative there is the inevitable romance."

References

External links
 
 
 
 

1933 films
American black-and-white films
RKO Pictures films
Films directed by Irving Pichel
1933 drama films
American drama films
1930s English-language films
Films with screenplays by Garrett Fort
American haunted house films
1930s American films